In molecular biology, Small Nucleolar RNA SNORD93 (also known as HBII-336) is a non-coding RNA (ncRNA) molecule which functions in the biogenesis (modification) of other small nuclear RNAs (snRNAs). This type of modifying RNA is located in the nucleolus of the Eukaryotic cell which is a major site of snRNA biogenesis. It is known as a small nucleolar RNA (snoRNA) and also often referred to as a guide RNA.

SNORD93 belongs to the C/D box class of snoRNAs which contain the C (UGAUGA) and D (CUGA) box motifs. Most of the members of the box C/D family function in directing site-specific 2'-O-methylation of substrate RNAs. This snoRNA is the human orthologue of mouse snoRNA MBII-336.
SNORD93 is predicted to guide the 2'O-ribose methylation of 18S ribosomal RNA (rRNA) residue A576.
Additionally, SNORD93 can be processed into a smaller, microRNA-like fragment (termed snoRNA-derived RNA(sdRNA)) that contributes to the malignant phenotype of breast cancer.
The processed piece (sdRNA-93) has been shown to target Pipox, a sarcosine metabolism-related protein whose expression significantly correlates with distinct molecular subtypes of breast cancer.

References

External links 
 
 

Non-coding RNA